Chlorobis(cyclooctene)iridium dimer is an organoiridium compound with the formula Ir2Cl2(C8H14)4, where C8H14 is cis-cyclooctene. Sometimes abbreviated Ir2Cl2(coe)4, it is a yellow, air-sensitive solid that is used as a precursor to many other organoiridium compounds and catalysts.  

The compound is prepared by heating an alcohol solution of sodium hexachloroiridate with cyclooctene in ethanol.  The coe ligands are easily displaced by other more basic ligands, more so than the diene ligands in the related complex cyclooctadiene iridium chloride dimer.  For example, with triphenylphosphine (PPh3), it reacts to give IrCl(PPh3)3:
Ir2Cl2(C8H14)4  +  6 PPh3  →  2 IrCl(PPh3)3  +  4 C8H14

References

Organoiridium compounds
Homogeneous catalysis
Alkene complexes
Dimers (chemistry)
Chloro complexes